Percy Clifford Mills (10 January 1909 – 1967) was an English footballer who played in the Football League for Notts County where he made over 400 appearances.

Family
Percy’s brother Paddy Mills was also a footballer, notably for Hull City and Notts County.

Percy is also the grandfather of former Hull City and Leicester City manager Nigel Pearson.

References

1909 births
1967 deaths
English footballers
English Football League players
Barton Town F.C. (1880) players
Grimsby Town F.C. players
Hull City A.F.C. players
Notts County F.C. players
Association football defenders